Honey is the eighth studio album by Swedish singer Robyn, and her first since Body Talk (2010). It was released on 26 October 2018 through Konichiwa, Island and Interscope Records. It features the singles "Missing U", "Honey" (a version of which originally featured in the final season of the HBO series Girls in 2017), "Ever Again", "Beach 2k20", and "Baby Forgive Me". The song "Send to Robin Immediately" also served as part of the promotional campaign for the singer's clothing line collaboration with Björn Borg.

The album features collaborations with Joseph Mount of Metronomy, Klas Åhlund, Adam Bainbridge, Mr. Tophat, and Zhala. It has been called a "significant departure from the hooky, sparkling electro-pop" of the Body Talk album series that in contrast, "pushed even deeper into the emotional intensity which has defined her music, with sparser arrangements and an unusually brooding atmosphere".

Background, writing and recording
Reeling from a breakup with longtime collaborator Max Vitali in 2014, Robyn spiraled into depression that severely deepened upon the death of close friend Christian Falk to cancer for which she cancelled her associated tour. Following an intensive therapy regimen of at least three meetings per week for years that also unpacked everything from an abortion at 18, her parents' divorce, lost childhood then exhaustion in the pursuit of pop stardom in a predatory industry and called-off engagement to Olof Inger, her therapist eventually cut her time down, expressing that the excessive appointments were becoming counterproductive.

Turning to music, she went clubbing globally for inspiration on a new project, drawing many of her ideas in particular from her time at Pikes Hotel in Ibiza. Lost for months, finally found her spark again after hearing DJ Koze's track "XTC" for the first time at a club in Los Angeles, describing it as having "changed [her] life". Inspired again, she first reached out to Joseph Mount of Metronomy and they eventually kept collaborating beyond their expected one-off session. Mount said he had to adjust to Robyn's "emotional transparency" while writing, understanding over time that it is "integral to what she does".

Robyn has stated that the album, recorded in part at studios in Stockholm, London, Paris, New York and Ibiza, features "much more production work on my end". She also said the album represents "this sweet place, like a very soft ecstasy. [...] I danced a lot when I was making it. I found a sensuality and a softness that I don't think I was able to use in the same way before. Everything just became softer." Robyn initially began working on the record alone, which she said allowed her to be more sensual. The album was named for its "glowing, transcendent" title track, which The New York Times has called Robyn's "masterpiece".

Robyn created the demo for "Missing U" in the summer 2014 on her laptop along with a LinnDrum machine and a software synth. She noted that the lyrics for the song took two years to complete, before finishing them with producers Joseph Mount and Klas Åhlund.

Music
Robyn became more involved in the production of Honey than she had been on her previous albums, including making beats herself. This resulted in sounds including what The New York Times called "outré future pop" on the track "Human Being", "sensual throb" on "Baby Forgive Me" and "playful '90s house" on "Between the Lines". The song "Send to Robin Immediately" samples the 1989 house track "French Kiss" by Lil Louis, which was the idea of English musician Kindness. Pitchfork writer Jason King notes the album is a "breathless, existential post-disco record".

Promotion

Robyn announced she was working on a new album in February 2018 and teased new music throughout the year; she even appeared at one of the regular Robyn-themed dance events hosted at the Brooklyn Bowl, where she played "Honey" in full for the first time. At the Red Bull Music Festival in New York in May 2018, Robyn stated: "With this album I've gone more back into the softer I get, the more it happens, and the more colors and dynamic a song gets. And for me, that meant shutting down for awhile and being sparse with my impressions and sensitive to what I needed."

The album was officially announced by Robyn in a video message posted to her social media accounts in September 2018. She explained, "It's a personal album, and there are so many things that happened throughout making it that it's really hard for me to explain in one go. I think the best way is for you to listen to it." On 24 September, Robyn revealed the track listing. The full version of "Honey" was premiered by Annie Mac on BBC Radio 1 on 26 September, and was made available as a two-track single online the same day along with the album becoming available to pre-order.

On 20 June 2020, Robyn released a four piece limited edition 12" vinyl series, which featured remixes of songs from the album. The four editions included "Honey", "Ever Again", "Baby Forgive Me" and "Between the Lines / Beach2k20". They were issued as part of the Love Record Stores Day 2020 event and 500 copies of each vinyl were manufactured.

Commercial performance
In the U.S., Honey debuted at number 40 on the Billboard 200 chart and number 1 on the Top Dance/Electronic Albums chart, earning 15,000 equivalent album units, according to Nielsen Music, with 11,000 from traditional album sales.

Critical reception

On review aggregator Metacritic, Honey has received a score of 89 out of 100 based on 22 reviews from critics, indicating "universal acclaim". Stacey Anderson of Pitchfork rated the album 8.5 out of 10, giving it the distinction of "Best New Music", and called it an "enthralling record" that "carries the sheen of being created on purely individual terms, on a singular timeline". Anderson said that Honey "builds a bridge from its predecessor, the bionic Body Talk, into a place of new conviction and warmth", with Robyn presenting musical ideas "in a way that makes her resolutions feel both instinctive and deeply traveled; melodies and emotions resolve simultaneously, slowly, and imperfectly, without editorialized conclusions". In her review for AllMusic, Heather Phares gave the album 4.5 stars out of 5, claiming "Robyn continues to make the trends instead of following them, and with Honey, she enters her forties with some of her most emotionally satisfying and musically innovative music."

In a capsule review for Vice, Robert Christgau gave the album a three-star honourable mention and lamented "how I wish she was the pop sparkplug, club buddy, big sister, and strong lover of the glorious old Body Talk trilogy, but either she doesn't have the hooks anymore or she thinks she's beyond them"; "Missing U" and "Between the Lines" were cited as highlights.

Accolades

Track listing

Notes
  signifies a co-producer.
 Lyrics of "Missing U" partly inspired by "Arvet" by Bruno K Öijer.
 "Send to Robin Immediately" contains a sample of "French Kiss" by Lil Louis.

Personnel
Credits adapted from the liner notes of Honey.

Musicians
 Robyn – vocals ; Sawer synthesiser programming ; additional arranging ; vocal arranging 
 Joseph Mount – synthesiser programming ; bass guitar ; additional vocals ; additional synthesiser programming ; electric guitar ; vocal arranging 
 Klas Åhlund – additional programming ; deleted flamenco solo ; programming 
 Zhala – additional vocals 
 Mr. Tophat – drum programming, sad robot voice, additional arranging ; vocal arranging 
 Adam Bainbridge – additional vocals 
 Mathis Picard – keyboard 
 Sampha Sisay – bass synthesiser 
 Ulf Engström – bass guitar 

Artwork
 David Lane – creative direction
 Heji Shin – photography
 Sophie Durham – set design
 Laura Jouan – type design
 David Jenewein – photo assistance
 Andreas Klassen – photo assistance
 Joshua Yates – set design assistance
 Molly Owen – set design assistance

Technical
 Joseph Mount – production ; vocal recording 
 Klas Åhlund – production ; vocal recording 
 Robyn – co-production ; vocal recording 
 Zhala – additional vocals recording 
 Mr. Tophat – production, vocal recording 
 Adam Bainbridge – production 
 David Jones – studio assistance 
 Ludvig Larsson – studio assistance 
 NealHPogue – mixing 
 Serban Ghenea – mixing 
 John Hanes – engineering for mix 
 Zdar – mixing 
 Antoine Poyeton – studio assistance 
 Louis Gallet – studio assistance 
 Mike Bozzi – mastering 
 Randy Merrill – mastering 
 Mike Marsh – mastering

Charts

Weekly charts

Year-end charts

See also
 List of Billboard number-one electronic albums of 2018
 List of number-one singles and albums in Sweden

References

2018 albums
Albums produced by Klas Åhlund
Interscope Records albums
Robyn albums
Post-disco albums